Manipur Zoological Garden is a zoo in Iroisemba, Manipur. It is the second habitat of Sangai (Cervus eldi eldi), the world's only dancing deer species, after the Keibul Lamjao National Park, the world's only floating national park. It is a medium sized zoological garden. It houses Schedule 1 species of amphibians, birds, mammals and reptiles. The animals kept in the zoo are mostly endemic to Manipur. The Central Zoo Authority of India recognized it as the coordinating zoo for the conservation breeding center of Sangai and Serow.

The best time to visit the zoo during summer is from April to September. The best time during Winter is from October to March. Monday is usually closed.

History 

The Manipur Zoological Garden was established on 2 October 1976.

Location 
The Manipur Zoological Garden is located in Iroisemba town along the Imphal-Kangchup road. It is in the Imphal West District. It is 5–6 km away from Imphal.

Features 

The zoo offers its visitors to have an opportunity to see the graceful Sangai, the brow antlered deer. This deer is one of the rarest and one of the most endangered species in the world. This zoo is located at the foothills of the pine growing hillocks in the westernmost corner of Lamphelpat.

Conservation 

It is an in situ conservation center of 45 endangered mammals, reptiles and birds. Many Schedule 1 species of mammals, reptiles, birds and amphibians are kept in the zoo. The animals endemic to Manipur are kept in the zoo. It is recognised as the coordinating zoo for the conservation breeding center of Sangai and Serow by the Central Zoo Authority of India.

See also 
 Imphal Peace Museum
 INA War Museum
 Kakching Garden
 Keibul Lamjao National Park - world's only floating national park in Manipur, India
 Khonghampat Orchidarium
 Loktak Folklore Museum
 Manipur State Museum
 Phumdi - Floating biomasses in Manipur, India
 Sekta Archaeological Living Museum
 Yangoupokpi-Lokchao Wildlife Sanctuary

References 

Zoos in India
Buildings and structures in Manipur